The International Socialists is a Canadian socialist organization which is part of the International Socialist Tendency. The IS in Canada publishes Socialist Worker, an English-language monthly paper, and holds an annual Marxism conference every spring in Toronto.

Early history
The initial members consisted of activists involved in the Movement for an Independent Socialist Canada (better known as the Waffle), which had been forced to leave the social democratic New Democratic Party in 1972. A group of students at York University in Toronto formed a Marxist study group, and came into contact with left-Shachtmanites in the International Socialists (USA), an American group founded by Hal Draper.

After the collapse of the Waffle in late 1974, the group organized itself as the Independent Socialists in February 1975. This reflected the roots of the IS in the Waffle, which had a "left-nationalist" analysis of Canada's place in the world economy. But the name was in contradiction to the internationalist approach of the IS, and by 1976, the group voted to rename itself the International Socialists. From 1975, the IS published a monthly paper called Workers Action. In 1985, the paper was renamed Socialist Worker.

The IS is often identified as the "state-capitalist" group—reflecting the position of the IS that, from 1928 on, Soviet Union was no longer a workers' state, but state capitalist. This is in contrast to Leon Trotsky's position that the Soviet Union was a degenerated workers state. The state capitalist position was not actually central to the group's founding in 1975. Several prominent members adhered to the "bureaucratic collectivist" position associated with Max Shachtman, but by the late 1970s, the majority position in the group was clearly "state capitalist", outlined most clearly in Abbie Bakan's pamphlet, The Great Lie.

During the 1980s, the group was heavily involved in women's struggles, playing an important role in mobilizing support for legal abortion in Canada, largely as a participant in the broader Ontario Coalition for Abortion Clinics. Early in the decade, it was prominent as a defender of the new trade union movement in Poland, Solidarity.

From 1985 to 1986, when the IS was no more than 80 members, a crisis led to the division of the Toronto branch. The Toronto Central branch represented the majority and was led by David McNally. The Toronto East branch represented the minority faction and was led by Abbie Bakan and supported by the Montreal branch. The crisis caused leading members of the Socialist Workers Party (SWP) in the UK to write an open letter of concern, urging the unity of the Toronto branch. Some attributed the dispute to personal animosities between leading members. But there was also a tension between a tendency towards propaganda by the majority, and an emphasis on an interventionist perspective by the minority.

A united steering committee slate was put forward and elected at the 1987 convention of the IS, addressed by Alex Callinicos, leading member of the SWP. The two Toronto branches fused into a single branch. That year, for the first time, the IS counted more than 100 members, and continued to grow through the late 1980s and into the early 1990s – intervening into the campaign to defend abortion clinics in Toronto, helping to build the movement against the war in the Gulf, and building in the student movement across the country. It is in this period that the IS also began to flesh out its position on the national question in Quebec, although it was not able to operate to any degree in French in Quebec.

The 1990s
The IS grew rapidly in the early 1990s, from 150 to 340 members in 1993–94 alone according to the group's claims. Further growth was achieved during the "Days of Action", a series of one-day general strikes between late 1995 and 1998 against the Ontario Progressive Conservative Party government, led by Premier Mike Harris. During this period of growth, the publication of Socialist Worker - the organization's paper - became fortnightly rather than monthly.

The unexpected and rapid growth of the group during this period led to a large split in 1996. A section of the organization argued that there were new possibilities for growth in the 1990s, and a more interventionist, activist organization was necessary. Another section of the organization thought that the interventionist perspective was based on an overly-optimistic analysis of the period, and were loath to move too far away from a propagandist, educational orientation. The section arguing for a more interventionist line carried the day at the November 1994 convention, Socialist Worker began appearing bi-weekly in January 1995, and the organization began publishing a monthly French paper. One year later, several leading members (including David McNally) resigned, and a faction emerged called the Political Reorientation Faction (PRF). The PRF produced a document rejecting the International Socialist Tendency's analysis of an upswing in class struggle during the mid-1990s, ("the 1990s is the 1930s in slow motion") and the Leninist conception of the party. Within weeks, members of the PRF (with one exception) left the IS to form the New Socialist Group prompting criticism from the IS majority for quitting rather than engaging in a proper political debate. The departing minority, however, argued that their position in the IS had become untenable and that their right to debate and organize were not tolerated by the majority.

21st century
The membership of the IS fell, and the publication frequency of Socialist Worker was reduced from every two weeks to monthly. It is now printed in full colour. Its French-language periodical, Résistance!, has ceased publication, and its annual theoretical journal, Marxism, has remained on hiatus. The IS has begun publishing a monthly campus newsletter called "the Agitator." The IS annual Marxism conference is also smaller; where the main event of the conference would draw as many as 500 attendees at the group's height, now the turnout is less than 100 per year.

The IS played a role in helping launch the movement against the war on Iraq, and is active in the War Resisters Support Campaign. It has several branches in Toronto as well as in Ottawa, Hamilton, Vancouver and members in several other cities. It was involved in the fight against Toronto Mayor Rob Ford, Occupy Toronto, and in the abortion rights, trade union, and student movements. Members of the IS in Toronto have been heavily involved in starting the Toronto Disability Pride March, which has taken place annually since 2011. 
On March 20, 2013, founding member Abbie Bakan, former Socialist Worker editor Paul Kellogg, and a few other members released a public statement announcing their resignation from the IS after a motion to write a public a letter of concern to the British SWP over its handling of rape allegations against one of its leaders was voted down at their annual convention. The IS Steering Committee responded that the resignation letter distorted "the democratic discussion and decisions at our Convention," noting that the IS "took very seriously the allegation of rape and the other issues raised by the crisis in the SWP and the discussion focused on whether an open letter intervening in the internal crisis of another organization would help the membership resolve their own dispute in a positive way. After discussing it, a majority at our Convention determined not to intervene and to allow the comrades in the SWP the space to debate the way forward through their own structures and processes."

Student component

Since the mid-1980s when the group took a political turn towards the student movement, much of the IS's work occurs on university campuses and most of its members are either university students or joined while in university. It was once quite active at the University of Toronto, where one member became president of the Student Administrative Council as part of a broader left wing slate. In recent years, they have been most active at York University in Toronto and Langara College in Vancouver.

In November 2012, IS members initiated a campaign against the local men's rights club at the University of Toronto, bringing together a coalition of students called UofT Students Against Sexism in order to protest a lecture given by controversial men's rights activist Warren Farrell. The protest drew around 100 people, and sparked a larger debate on campus around the existence of men's rights clubs.

Political stances
Unlike much of the mainstream left in Canada, the International Socialists oppose Left Nationalism which argues that Canada is a colony or dependency of the United States. The IS maintains that Canada is a leading capitalist country with an independent ruling class that carries out its own acts of imperialism. At the same time, members of the IS, including members of its steering committee, were also members of the left nationalist Council of Canadians as recently as 2002.

The group supports international socialism and Québécois and First Nations struggles for self-determination, up to and including independence. In Quebec, the IS does not, however, support the separatist Parti Québécois, which they see as a bourgeois nationalist party. The IS is involved in Québec Solidaire, a merger of the Union des Forces Progressistes and the Option Citoyenne.

The International Socialists argue for "critical support" of the New Democratic Party (NDP) on the federal and provincial levels, since the NDP, despite its flaws, is the party of the working class in Canada, and a victory for the NDP gives confidence to working class activists and those in the social movements to fight for reforms. Once the NDP is elected, IS members see the opportunity to expose the inability of social democrats to effect real change.  IS members may occasionally work alongside NDP activists on certain campaigns despite the fact that IS members generally do not join the NDP. For example, In 2003, members of the IS worked on Joe Comartin's NDP leadership campaign.

Criticism

IS members have been criticized by other far-Left groups, including those who situate their roots within the broader International Socialist Tendency. The IS has been criticized for its role in the peace movement in Toronto where it has an influential position in the Toronto Coalition to Stop the War (TCSW). The June 30th Committee, an independent Toronto anti-war group, argues that TCSW was decisively influenced by the IS to sabotage their demonstration on June 30, 2004. It did so by calling a demonstration for the same time and location as the J30 demonstration and then proceeded to split the demonstration. One account can be found Toronto's Now Magazine. TCSW and IS members dispute this account. Other detractors argue that the IS did the same thing again for an emergency rally in November 2004 called by the Ontario Coalition Against Poverty.

The IS has also been criticized for its alleged role in undermining an anti-racist demonstration in Ottawa in May 1993. Strong criticisms of the IS were made in the second edition of Warren Kinsella's book Web of Hate and in the anarchist magazine Arm the Spirit.

References

External links
International Socialists web site
Origins of the International Socialists, on the Socialist History Project web site
Canadian International Socialist faction fight documents (1986)
Documents from 1994-96 Canadian IS faction fights
International Socialists – Canadian Political Parties and Political Interest Groups – Web Archive created by the University of Toronto Libraries

Far-left politics in Canada
International Socialist Tendency
Trotskyist organizations in Canada